is a retired Japanese female mixed martial artist. She won the 2010 Jewels Rough Stone GP in the -48 kg category.

Ishikawa was the first female mixed martial artist from Okinawa.

Background
Originally a Real Gym member and regular freelance training partner of Pancrase fighter and fellow Okinawan Mitsuhisa Sunabe, she later moved to Yokohama where she joined Reversal Gym Yokohama Ground Slam.

Mixed martial arts career
On  at Jewels 1st Ring, Ishikawa debuted with a victory over Sumie Yamada via submission (triangle choke) in 62 seconds.

Ishikawa was originally set to fight against Mami Odera as part of the 2009 Jewels -48 kg Rough Stone Grand Prix, but Odera was injured before the bout and Ishikawa was given direct entrance to the final and fought instead in a regular match at the event.

On  at Jewels 11th Ring, Ishikawa won the 2010 Jewels -48 kg Rough Stone Grand Prix by defeating Yukiko Seki in the tournament final via split decision.

She defeated Yamamoto by unanimous decision.

She defeated Tamada by unanimous decision. She was defeated by split decision.

She won the fight by unanimous decision.

On , it was announced that Ishikawa would no longer be competing on the card.

On , Ishikawa faced Tomo Maesawa at Jewels 22nd Ring. She defeated Maesawa by unanimous decision.

She defeated Kusaka by TKO in the first round.

On , Ishikawa returned to Pancrase to face American opponent Amber Brown at Pancrase 250. She was defeated by submission due to an armbar in the third round.

Mixed martial arts record

|-
| Loss
|align=center| 9-4-0
| Amber Brown
| Submission (armbar)
| Pancrase 250: 2013 Neo-Blood Tournament Finals
| 
|align=center| 3
|align=center| 3:27
| Tokyo, Japan
| 
|-
| Win
|align=center| 9-3-0
| Miyoko Kusaka
| TKO (punch)
| Pancrase: Sakaguchi Dojo vs. Pancrase
| 
|align=center| 1
|align=center| 1:43
| Okinawa, Okinawa, Japan
| 
|-
| Win
|align=center| 8-3-0
| Tomo Maesawa
| Decision (unanimous)
| Jewels 22nd Ring
| 
|align=center| 2
|align=center| 5:00
| Tokyo, Japan
| 
|-
| Win
|align=center| 7-3-0
| Shino VanHoose
| Decision (unanimous)
| Pancrase Progress Tour 6
| 
|align=center| 2
|align=center| 5:00
| Okinawa, Okinawa, Japan
| 
|-
| Loss
|align=center| 6-3-0
| Naho Sugiyama
| Decision (split)
| Jewels 17th Ring
| 
|align=center| 2
|align=center| 5:00
| Tokyo, Japan
| 
|-
| Win
|align=center| 6-2-0
| Yasuko Tamada
| Decision (unanimous)
| Jewels 16th Ring
| 
|align=center| 2
|align=center| 5:00
| Tokyo, Japan
| 
|-
| Win
|align=center| 5-2-0
| Sachiko Yamamoto
| Decision (unanimous)
| Jewels 15th Ring
| 
|align=center| 2
|align=center| 5:00
| Tokyo, Japan
|
|-
| Win
|align=center| 4-2-0
| Yukiko Seki
| Decision (split)
| Jewels 11th Ring
| 
|align=center| 2
|align=center| 5:00
| Tokyo, Japan
| 
|-
| Win
|align=center| 3-2-0
| Misaki Ozawa
| Submission (armbar)
| Jewels 10th Ring
| 
|align=center| 1
|align=center| 2:24
| Tokyo, Japan
| 
|-
| Loss
|align=center| 2-2-0
| Miyoko Kusaka
| Decision (split)
| Jewels 7th Ring
| 
|align=center| 2
|align=center| 5:00
| Tokyo, Japan
|
|-
| Loss
|align=center| 2-1-0
| Asami Kodera
| Decision (unanimous)
| Jewels 6th Ring
| 
|align=center| 2
|align=center| 5:00
| Tokyo, Japan
| 
|-
| Win
|align=center| 2-0-0
| Asako Saioka
| Submission (rear-naked choke)
| Jewels 5th Ring
| 
|align=center| 1
|align=center| 1:18
| Tokyo, Japan
|
|-
| Win
|align=center| 1-0-0
| Sumie Yamada
| Submission (triangle choke)
| Jewels 1st Ring
| 
|align=center| 1
|align=center| 1:02
| Tokyo, Japan
|

Championships
 2010 Jewels -48 kg Rough Stone Grand Prix Champion

See also
List of female mixed martial artists

References

External links
Official blog 
 Kikuyo Ishikawa Awakening Profile

Profile at Pancrase 
 

1984 births
Japanese female mixed martial artists
Mixed martial artists utilizing kickboxing
Living people
People from Okinawa Prefecture
Atomweight mixed martial artists